The 1937–38 British Home Championship was a football tournament played between the British Home Nations during the 1937–38 season. The competition was won by England after they defeated Ireland and Wales in their opening games. Even though Scotland won the final game at Wembley Stadium, England were able to hold their lead, thanks to the Welsh victory over Scotland in their opening match. Wales however were unable to continue this form, losing to England and Ireland in their subsequent matches. The Scots and Irish drew, and thus shared second place.

Table

Results

References

External links 
 rsssf

1937–38 in English football
1937–38 in Scottish football
1937 in British sport
1937–38 in Welsh football
1938 in British sport
1937-38
1937–38 in Northern Ireland association football